Faizabad Cantt, officially known as Ayodhya Cantt, is a cantonment town area in Faizabad district (officially Ayodhya district) in the Indian state of Uttar Pradesh. The official name of the cantonment was changed from  Faizabad Cantt to Ayodhya Cantt in October 2022 by the Government of India

Demographics
 India census, Faizabad Cantt had a population of 25,695. Males constitute 51% of the population and females 49%. Faizabad Cantt has an average literacy rate of 62%, higher than the national average of 59.5%: male literacy is 71%, and female literacy is 52%. Faizabad Cantt, 17% of the population is under 6 years of age.

References

Neighbourhoods in Faizabad
Industrial Area in Faizabad